Ajit Parab is an Indian music director and composer and also a film playback singer and an actor.

Early life 
He studied at D. G. Ruparel College, Matunga, Mumbai-400016 (Mumbai University) and D.G. Ruparel College. He did his schooling from  D.B. Kulkarni School.

Career 
Parab started his career as music director in the film Huppa Haiyya in Marathi. He composes music for films and has also sung songs in films. He does acting in the Marathi films.

He gave the music to the film Me Shivajiraje Bhosale Boltoy along with Ajay Atul which was very popular. Recently, he gave the  music to the film Natsamrat and also acted in it.

Discography

Films

Songs

Awards 

Indian male composers
Living people
Music directors
Marathi-language singers
1975 births